The 1959 Los Angeles Dodgers finished in a first-place tie with the Milwaukee Braves, with each club going 86–68.  The Dodgers won the pennant as they swept the Braves in a best-of-three playoff series. They went on to defeat the Chicago White Sox in the 1959 World Series in just their second season since leaving Brooklyn. The Dodgers led all 16 Major League Baseball clubs in home attendance, drawing 2,071,045 fans to Los Angeles Memorial Coliseum.

Offseason 
 December 4, 1958: Gino Cimoli was traded by the Dodgers to the St. Louis Cardinals for Wally Moon and Phil Paine.
 December 23, 1958: Sparky Anderson was traded by the Dodgers to the Philadelphia Phillies for Rip Repulski, Jim Golden and Gene Snyder.

While training in Vero Beach, the Dodgers played their home spring training games at Payne Park in Sarasota, Florida in 1959.

Regular season

Season standings

Record vs. opponents

Opening Day lineup

Notable transactions 
 June 15, 1959: Dick Gray was traded by the Dodgers to the St. Louis Cardinals for Chuck Essegian and Lloyd Merritt.

Roster

Player stats

Batting

Starters by position 
Note: Pos = Position; G = Games played; AB = At bats; H = Hits; Avg. = Batting average; HR = Home runs; RBI = Runs batted in

Other batters 
Note: G = Games played; AB = At bats; H = Hits; Avg. = Batting average; HR = Home runs; RBI = Runs batted in

Pitching

Starting pitchers 
Note: G = Games pitched; IP = Innings pitched; W = Wins; L = Losses; ERA = Earned run average; SO = Strikeouts

Other pitchers 
Note: G = Games pitched; IP = Innings pitched; W = Wins; L = Losses; ERA = Earned run average; SO = Strikeouts

Relief pitchers 
Note: G = Games pitched; W = Wins; L = Losses; SV = Saves; ERA = Earned run average; SO = Strikeouts

1959 World Series

Game 1 
October 1, 1959, at Comiskey Park I in Chicago

Game 2 
October 2, 1959, at Comiskey Park I in Chicago

Game 3 
October 4, 1959, at Los Angeles Memorial Coliseum in Los Angeles

Game 4 
October 5, 1959, at Los Angeles Memorial Coliseum in Los Angeles

Game 5 
October 6, 1959, at Los Angeles Memorial Coliseum in Los Angeles

Game 6 
October 8, 1959, at Comiskey Park I in Chicago

Awards and honors 
World Series Most Valuable Player
Larry Sherry
Gold Glove Award
Charlie Neal
Gil Hodges
TSN Manager of the Year
Walter Alston
TSN Executive of the Year Award
Buzzie Bavasi
NL Player of the Month
Don Drysdale (July 1959)

All-Stars 
1959 Major League Baseball All-Star Game – Game 1
Don Drysdale starter
Wally Moon starter
1959 Major League Baseball All-Star Game – Game 2
Don Drysdale starter
Wally Moon starter
Jim Gilliam reserve
Charlie Neal reserve

Farm system 

LEAGUE CHAMPIONS: Green Bay

Notes

References 
Baseball-Reference season page
Baseball Almanac season page

External links 
1959 Los Angeles Dodgers uniform
Los Angeles Dodgers official web site

Los Angeles Dodgers seasons
Los Angeles Dodgers season
National League champion seasons
World Series champion seasons